Mahu may refer to:

 , third gender person in some Polynesian cultures
 Mahu (noble), ancient Egyptian official of the 18th Dynasty
 Mahu (official), ancient Egyptian official of the 19th Dynasty
 Mahu, Estonia, village in Viru-Nigula Parish,  County, Estonia
 Mahu, Mingin, village in Sagaing Region of western Myanmar (Burma)
 Mawu, Dahomey goddess, sometimes called Mahu
 Cornelis Mahu (1613–1689), a Flemish Baroque painter 
 Stephan Mahu, (died 1541), composer of the Franco-Flemish School